Jaubert is a French surname of Germanic origin : Gaut- and -berht, first used as a given name. 

Notable people with the surname include:

George F. Jaubert, A Swiss citizen who in 1903 patented Oxylithe, a form of sodium peroxide or sodium dioxide: see rebreather
Hervé Jaubert (1960), French Navy officer who later worked for Exomos in Dubai
Hippolyte François Jaubert,  (1798–1874) was a French politician and botanist
Maurice Jaubert (1900–1940), a French composer
Pierre Amédée Jaubert (1779–1847), French Orientalist and traveller

See also
The French marine commando Jaubert
Joubert
Gaubert

French-language surnames